Orthoclada is a genus of African and Neotropical plants in the grass family.

 Species
 Orthoclada africana C.E.Hubb. - Zaire, Tanzania, Zambia
 Orthoclada laxa (Rich.) P.Beauv. - southern Mexico, Central America, Lesser Antilles, Trinidad & Tobago, Venezuela, French Guiana, Suriname, Guyana, Colombia, Ecuador, Peru, Bolivia, Brazil

References

Poaceae genera
Grasses of Africa
Grasses of North America
Grasses of South America
Grasses of Mexico
Flora of Central America
Flora of the Caribbean
Taxa named by Palisot de Beauvois
Panicoideae